Kathy Rain is a point-and-click adventure video game developed by Clifftop Games and published by Raw Fury.

Gameplay
Kathy Rain is a point-and-click adventure video game. The game is set in 1995 and follows a college girl named Kathy who returns to her hometown to look into a mystery related to her deceased grandfather.

Plot
In 1995, the eponymous protagonist Kathy Rain, a college student studying journalism, returns to her hometown of Conwell Springs after she learns of her paternal grandfather's, Joseph Rain's, passing. Having been abandoned by her father as a child and brought up by her mentally ill mother, Kathy is a very pessimistic and contemptuous individual. Nevertheless, at the insistence of her roommate, Eileen, also studying journalism, Kathy rides her motorcycle to her hometown for her grandfather's funeral. At the funeral, she immediately reconnects with her grandmother, a family member she had not seen since she was a child. Shortly after the funeral, Kathy's grandmother explains that on Aug. 16, 1981, the local sheriff had brought Joseph home looking as if "his soul had been ripped from his body". Since then, Joseph had been confined to a wheelchair in a vegetative state, eventually passing in the same state without any kind of proper medical explanation. Curious, Kathy decides to probe deeper into what happened to her grandfather.

Going around town, Kathy learns more about her grandfather, having been lied to about her paternal grandparents by her mother as a means of maintaining custody. Joseph was a retired Air Force pilot, and had a significant role in helping enforce law and order in Conwell Springs. He was and is very well respected in the community. After finding a tape from Joseph in the police archives, Kathy finds some of his belongings in the family attic and gets involved in a case Joseph had been investigating. In particular, a young girl named Lily Myers drowned in 1975 in an apparent suicide. Kathy visits her mother at their lakeside cabin and learns that leading up to Lily's death, she had become very withdrawn and engrossed in her paintings, which had generated particular interest for Joseph. Lily's mother had since sold off Lily's paintings to an art collector in order to continue supporting herself and her son, Nathan. The art collector happens to be Charles Wade, a fellow pilot and best friend of Joseph in years past. Kathy is eventually able to track down Charles at the local health clinic in Conwell Springs. Charles is elated to see Kathy after realizing who she is, and explains that he and Joseph had a falling out after Kathy's father, Brian, and her mother had become involved in criminal activity. Charles moved out of Conwell Springs later due to his growing business, but never forgot his friendship with Joseph. However, he knows nothing of the incident that caused Joseph to become comatose. He also explains that all the art he had bought from Lily's family had since been stolen from his family mansion, but has no further info on who may have stolen them or why. He phones ahead to the police to tell them to release the report on the theft to Kathy. Kathy eventually finds from the police report that the local bike gang, the Black Hats, stole the paintings. As her father had been part of that gang, Kathy is able to enter their bar and be on good terms with the members there. The gang president, Big Beau, refuses to divulge about the robbery, but the gang VP tells Kathy that their leader may be willing to speak up if she can uncover the secret ingredient to the special drink her father had always made for him, as the two had been close.

Unable to get more info at this point, Kathy turns her attention to an overdeveloped photo Joseph had stashed in a safe: an image of a forest with three bright orbs of lights and a red flower. Kathy has suspicions that the local church, whose founder ran a cult in the 70s, may know more as their symbol features the same three light orbs, but cannot get any more useful info from the current priest, Isaac. Eileen helps Kathy identify the flower as an endangered flower that has the ability to induce hallucinations. Kathy eventually finds her way to the spot where the photo was taken, but suddenly has a strange encounter with a mysterious bald man dressed in red who instructs her to continue following her grandfather. Kathy then mysteriously finds herself back at her grandmother's house. Kathy returns to the photo site, and this time finds a torn drawing by Nathan featuring the mysterious man in red. Nathan is nowhere to be found, but Kathy deduces from her experience that the red flower in the photo is the secret ingredient to recreate her father's custom drink, and gives the recreated drink to Big Beau. Kathy then learns from him that Isaac had hired the Black Hats to steal those paintings. Kathy sleeps at her grandmother's place for the night.

The next day, Eileen shows up unprompted at her grandmother's residence, hoping to assist Kathy after uncovering that there had been an unusually high number of disappearances and institutionalizations in Conwell Springs for the last few decades. Eileen decides to help Kathy by confronting Isaac about the art theft, as Kathy had already been unsuccessful at getting info out of the priest. Kathy takes this time to meet with Jimmy Cochran, a fellow pilot and friend to both Joseph and Charles, who is now currently admitted in the same institution where Kathy's mother is. Though Jimmy is deemed delusional, he is actually sharp and provides a supernatural insight on what had happened to Lily, Joseph, and many others. Jimmy ominously warns Kathy that Eileen is already in mortal danger, and so Kathy rushes back to Conwell Springs. Breaking into Isaac's office, she finds an ornate key but is quickly caught by Isaac and current sheriff for breaking and entering. Kathy is imprisoned, but quickly breaks out and finds that the key she swiped unlocks Isaac's family mausoleum in the town's cemetery. There, she knocks out Isaac and finds a comatose Eileen. Kathy takes another key from Isaac, gets him arrested, and then takes Eileen to her grandmother. The key Kathy stole takes her to a storage facility where Isaac had hoarded all of Lily's paintings, but now ruined with paint thinner. The same storage facility holds more memorabilia from Joseph in a neighboring unit, who is now revealed to have been investigating the supernatural phenomena in Conwell Springs prior to his becoming comatose. Kathy then goes to the police station to record a statement and confront Isaac. Isaac explains that he did not cause Joseph's incident, but interprets the vegetative states of Eileen and Joseph as being "claimed by God". Nevertheless, Isaac admits to being responsible for much of the missing locals in recent years. He also explains that he wasn't destroying Lily's paintings, but rather uncovering what was hidden underneath, and that the red man can be met somewhere north of Conwell Woods. Kathy then rushes to Lily's family home and uses paint thinner on Lily's last surviving landscape painting, which unveils a painting of Nathan holding Lily underwater. Kathy then meets Nathan outside the family home, where he explains that Lily had forced him to drown her. When asked about the red man in his drawings, Nathan explains that the red man always fought with Lily, and that he can still talk to her. Kathy then requests Nathan escort her to where he talks to Lily. Nathan takes Kathy to the site of Joseph's photo but is quickly blinded by the three light orbs that appear. Kathy has a vision that helps her uncover additional info hidden within Isaac's office. Kathy then proceeds decrypt that info to find the location Isaac mentioned: a deep pit in the middle of the forest surrounded by the hallucinogenic red flowers. The red man then appears and explains to Kathy what he needs to do to save Eileen, and Kathy proceed down into the pit.

The bottom of the pit proves to be a supernatural plane where visitors are forced to confront their pasts and sources of misery. Namely, Kathy is forced to come to terms with her hatred towards her parents. She eventually is guided by an apparition of Lily to meet with Joseph, who instruct Kathy to burn all the red flowers to sever this supernatural world from the reality above to save not just Eileen, but all future potential victims. The two bid farewell, but not before Joseph tells Kathy that he's proud of her for the remarkable courage she has shown throughout this journey. Kathy returns to the surface and uses paint thinner and her lighter to set the entire meadow ablaze. Kathy then heads back to find Eileen no longer comatose, and learns that Isaac had hung himself while in prison.

The next morning, Kathy and Eileen bid farewell to Joseph at his grave one more time. Kathy remarks that they had made a pretty good investigative team, and teases Eileen to not get kidnapped next time. Eileen ignores this, excited at the prospect that there will be a "next time".

Development and release
Kathy Rain was developed by Clifftop Games, a one-man Swedish indie studio founded by Joel Staaf Hästö. Hästö called the television series Twin Peaks an influence for the game. The game was developed using the Adventure Game Studio development tool. The game was showcased at Gamescom in 2015. The game was published by Raw Fury and released for Windows and macOS on 5 May 2016, alongside a demo. The game was later released for Android and iOS on 23 November 2016. In early 2021, a director's cut for the game was announced, and was released for Windows, macOS, Android, iOS and Nintendo Switch on 26 October 2021.

Reception

Kathy Rain was received favourably by video game critics. Despite the game's initial sales being underwhelming, publisher Raw Fury vowed to continue supporting the developer.

See also
Whispers of a Machine, Clifftop Games' next game

References

External links
 
 

2016 video games
Adventure Game Studio games
AGS Award winners
Android (operating system) games
Detective video games
Nintendo Switch games
Indie video games
IOS games
MacOS games
Point-and-click adventure games
Single-player video games
Video games developed in Sweden
Video games featuring female protagonists
Video games set in 1995
Windows games
Raw Fury games
Clifftop Games games